Doris Marsh was a pitcher who played in the All-American Girls Professional Baseball League. She batted and threw right handed.

Marsh spent a season with the Fort Wayne Daisies in 1945 and made three pitching appearances. She posted a 0–2 record with a 3.18 ERA in 17.0 innings of work, striking out two, while walking eight and hitting one batter. At the plate, she went hitless in five at-bats.

The AAGPBL folded in 1954, but there is a permanent display at the Baseball Hall of Fame and Museum at Cooperstown, New York since November 5, 1988, that honors the entire league rather than any individual figure.

Sources

All-American Girls Professional Baseball League players
Baseball players from Indiana
People from Elkhart, Indiana
Date of birth missing
Possibly living people
Year of birth missing